The 1980 Pacific Coast Athletic Association men's basketball tournament (now known as the Big West Conference men's basketball tournament) was held February 28–March 2 at the Anaheim Convention Center in Anaheim, California.

San José State topped  in the championship game, 57–55, to win the Spartans' first PCAA/Big West men's basketball tournament. 

The Spartans, in turn, received a bid to the 1980 NCAA tournament, their second all-time. They were joined in the tournament by regular season-champions Utah State, who earned an at-large bid.

Format
After increasing to eight teams in 1979, the tournament field decreased back to seven. PCAA member Fresno State did not participate.

With only seven teams participating, the top-seeded team was given a bye into the semifinals while the remaining six teams were entered into the first round and seeded based on regular season conference records.

Bracket

Notes

References

Big West Conference men's basketball tournament
Tournament
Pacific Coast Athletic Association men's basketball tournament
Pacific Coast Athletic Association men's basketball tournament